This is a list of the mammal species recorded in American Samoa. There are eight mammal species in American Samoa, of which one is endangered and two are vulnerable.

The following tags are used to highlight each species' conservation status as assessed by the International Union for Conservation of Nature:

Order: Chiroptera (bats) 

The bats' most distinguishing feature is that their forelimbs are developed as wings, making them the only mammals capable of flight. Bat species account for about 20% of all mammals.

Family: Pteropodidae (flying foxes, Old World fruit bats)
Subfamily: Pteropodinae
Genus: Pteropus
 Samoa flying-fox, Pteropus samoensis VU
 Insular flying-fox, Pteropus tonganus LR/lc
Family: Vespertilionidae
Subfamily: Myotinae
Genus: Myotis
 Insular myotis, Myotis insularum DD
Family: Emballonuridae
Genus: Emballonura
 Polynesian sheath-tailed bat, Emballonura semicaudata EN

Order: Cetacea (whales) 

The order Cetacea includes whales, dolphins and porpoises. They are the mammals most fully adapted to aquatic life with a spindle-shaped nearly hairless body, protected by a thick layer of blubber, and forelimbs and tail modified to provide propulsion underwater.

Suborder: Mysticeti
Family: Balaenopteridae
Subfamily: Megapterinae
Genus: Megaptera
 Humpback whale, Megaptera novaeangliae LC
Suborder: Odontoceti
Superfamily: Platanistoidea
Family: Ziphidae
Subfamily: Hyperoodontinae
Genus: Mesoplodon
 Ginkgo-toothed beaked whale, Mesoplodon ginkgodens DD
Family: Delphinidae (marine dolphins)
Genus: Stenella
 Spinner dolphin, Stenella longirostris LR/cd
Genus: Lagenodelphis
 Fraser's dolphin, Lagenodelphis hosei DD

Notes

References

See also
List of chordate orders
Lists of mammals by region
List of prehistoric mammals
Mammal classification
List of mammals described in the 2000s

American Samoa
Mammals of American Samoa
Mammals
American Samoa